Agaricus albolutescens is a moderate-sized, stocky-statured mushroom with a pleasant odor; it bruises slowly but persistently yellow. This character distinguishes it from other Agaricus species, such as Agaricus xanthodermus, a mildly toxic species which has a phenolic or medicinal odor, and bruises fleetingly yellow. Fieldmarks of Agaricus albolutescens include a tendency to discolor tawny-brown, rather than merely yellow, and chocolate-brown free gills. Agaricus silvicola is very similar but has a less dramatic bruising reaction, more yellowish than tawny, a normal rather than stocky stature, and slightly smaller spores.  A. albolutescens and A. silvicola represent a single polymorphic species or a species complex.

Description

Pileus
The cap is 6–12 cm broad, and convex; it becomes planoconvex to planodepressed. The margin is incurved, then decurved, overlapping the gills. Occasionally, it is wavy and appendiculate from veil fragments. The surface is dry and white; when bruised, it turns tawny-brown. The context varies from 1.5 to 2.0 cm thick; it is firm and turns pale-peach when cut. When the flesh is dry, odor and taste is musty. Albolutescens, in botanical Latin, which has developed a much richer vocabulary of color words than the Romans had, signifies a yellowish white.

Lamellae
The gills are free, close, and, at first, pallid, though they then turn a pale pinkish-tan. As it ages, A. albsolutescens is dark chocolate-brown in color. The lamellulae are in five to six series.

Stipe
The stipe is 2.0-7.0 cm long, 1.5-3.0 cm thick, and more or less equal except for a bulbous base. In addition, it has a narrow, cottony central core. The surface of the apex is palled and finely striate, while the lower stipe can vary from glabrous to sparsely covered with whitish fibrils, occasionally sheathed with cottony-floccose veil remnants. Like the cap, it yellows. The partial veil is layered. The surface underneath can be cottony or fibrillose. Sometimes, it fragments, leaving scattered cottony patches over a membranous-tomentose basement layer. The annulus is superior, thin, and initially erect, then pendulous.

Spores
Spores are 6.0-7.5 x 4.0-5.0 µm, elliptical, and inequilateral in profile.  In addition, they are smooth, moderately thick-walled, and have an inconspicuous hilar appendage. Their germ pore is absent.

Taxonomy
The holotype of Agaricus albolutescens was collected at Agate Beach, Oregon by Gertrude S. Burlingham on November 21, 1937.

References

Specific

albolutescens
Fungi described in 1938